Thomas Arthur Arkesden (July 1878 – 25 June 1951) was an English footballer who played as a forward. Born in Warwick, Arkesden played for Burton Wanderers, Derby County, and Burton United, before joining Manchester United for £150 on 2 February 1903. In 1907, he was transferred to Gainsborough Trinity. In 79 matches for Manchester United, he scored 33 goals.

External links
Profile at StretfordEnd.co.uk
Profile at MUFCInfo.com

1878 births
1921 deaths
English footballers
Association football forwards
Burton United F.C. players
Burton Wanderers F.C. players
Derby County F.C. players
Manchester United F.C. players
Gainsborough Trinity F.C. players
English Football League players
FA Cup Final players